Acompus rufipes is a species of true bug belonging to the family Rhyparochromidae.

It is native to Europe.

References

Rhyparochromidae